Shelbi JoDae Vaughan (born August 24, 1994) is an American track and field athlete whose specialty is the discus throw.

World Competition
Shelbi competed at the Athletics at the 2016 Summer Olympics - Women's discus throw and threw  to place 29th. She competed at the 2015 World Championships in Beijing narrowly missing the final. In addition, she was bronze medals at the 2012 World Junior Championships and the 2011 World Youth Championships.

NCAA
Vaughan's Texas A&M personal best in the discus is  set in Starkville in 2015.

Vaughan placed second in Discus at 2016 United States Olympic Trials (track and field) to qualify for Athletics at the 2016 Summer Olympics. Vaughan placed sixth in Discus at 2016 Division 1 NCAA Outdoor Women's Track and Field Championship. Vaughan won 2016 Southeastern Conference, UT San Antonio, Texas Relays, UCLA, Baylor and LSU Discus titles. Vaughan placed 6th in the Weight throw at 2016 SEC Indoor Track & Field Championships.

Vaughan placed third in Discus at 2015 USA Outdoor Track and Field Championships. Vaughan won 2015 Division 1 NCAA Outdoor Women's Track and Field Championship Discus title. Shelbi Vaughan won 2015 Division 1 Southeastern Conference Discus title. She also won 2015 Texas Relays, Stanford Invitational, Sun Angel Track Classic, TCU Horned Frogs Invite Discus titles.

Vaughan placed third in Discus at 2014 USA Outdoor Track and Field Championships. Vaughan won 2014 Division 1 NCAA Outdoor Women's Track and Field Championship Discus title. Shelbi Vaughan won 2014 Division 1 Southeastern Conference Discus title. She also won 2014 Texas Relays, Stanford Invitational, Sun Angel Track Classic, Texas State Bobcats Classics Discus titles.

Vaughan won 2013 Division 1 Southeastern Conference Discus title as a freshman. She also won 2013 Texas Relays, Oregon Pepsi Invitational, Louisiana State University Alumni Gold Invite, John McDonnell Invitational at University of Arkansas Discus titles.

High school
Vaughan was the 2012 Track and Field News "High School Athlete of the Year."

Vaughan's senior season's best of 50-1.25 in the Shot put and 198-9 in the Discus fifth and first respectively in 2012. She won University Interscholastic League Texas State championships in discus titles in 2011 and 2012. She placed 4th in 2012 United States Olympic Trials (track and field) just weeks after graduating high school with a   3rd place American record holder Suzy Powell-Roos did not have a qualifying mark for the Olympics and neither did Vaughn, so the Olympic slot went to Gia Lewis-Smallwood.

Before turning to track and field, she practiced volleyball while at Mansfield Legacy High School.

Competition record

References

External links
 
 
 
 
 
 A&M discus thrower Shelbi Vaughan cherishes Olympic experience
 

1994 births
Living people
American female discus throwers
World Athletics Championships athletes for the United States
People from Weatherford, Texas
Track and field athletes from Texas
Texas A&M Aggies men's track and field athletes
Athletes (track and field) at the 2016 Summer Olympics
Olympic track and field athletes of the United States
21st-century American women